This is a summary of the electoral history of Akbar Hashemi Rafsanjani, an Iranian politician who was member of Assembly of Experts from Tehran Province since 1982 and Chairman of the Expediency Discernment Council since 1989, and has been previously Chairman of the Assembly of Experts (2007–2011), President of Iran (1989–1997), and The Speaker and member of Islamic Consultative Assembly (1980–1989) from Tehran and Minister of Interior (1979–1980).

Parliament elections

1980 

He was elected to the Parliament representing Tehran with 1,151,514 (54%) votes. He was ranked 15th in the constituency and won a seat in first round.

1984 

He was elected to the Parliament representing Tehran with 1,891,264 (81.9%) votes. He received the most votes and won the first seat in the constituency.

1988 

He was elected to the Parliament representing Tehran with 1,573,587 (82.3%) votes.  He received the most votes and won the first seat in the constituency.

2000 

He received 749,884 (25.58%) votes and secured 30th and the last seat of Tehran for the parliament, but withdrawed after the election.

Speaker of the Parliament elections 
He was elected as Speaker of the Parliament of Iran in 10 consecutive sessions (3 terms).

Presidential elections

1989 

According to Nohen et al, he was the winner, receiving 15,537,394 votes (94.51%).  reported 15,550,528 votes (94.52%).

1993 

According to Nohen et al, he was the winner, receiving 10,449,933 votes (64%).  reported 10,566,499 (63%).

2005 

He was the leader in the first round, receiving 6,211,937 votes (21.13%).  In the second round, he dropped to second place with 10,046,701 votes (35.93%).

2013

Assembly of Experts

1982 

According to Abbas Abdi, he received ≈2.22 million votes out of ≈3.2 votes (≈69%) in Tehran.

1990 

According to Abbas Abdi, he received ≈1.60 million votes out of ≈1.9 votes (≈82%) in Tehran.

1998 

According to Abbas Abdi, he received ≈1.68 million votes out of ≈2.8 votes (≈60%) in Tehran.

2006 

According to the Iranian Students News Agency (ISNA), he received ≈1.56 million votes.

Chairman of the Assembly of Experts elections

References 

Akbar Hashemi Rafsanjani
Electoral history of Iranian politicians